WDDD-FM (107.3 FM) is an American country music formatted radio station licensed to Johnston City, Illinois.

W3D has been a country station for 30+ years.  On November 22, 1970, WDDD-FM first signed on. WDDD used to simulcast on 810 AM, which is no longer on the air.

Its sister stations are WFRX, WHET, WMIX, WMIX-FM, WTAO-FM, and WVZA.

External links
W3D's website

DDD
Country radio stations in the United States
Radio stations established in 1970
1970 establishments in Illinois